John Galas is an American soccer coach.

Early life
Galas was born in the United States, before moving to Switzerland with his family when he was 6 years old. When he returned to the United States four years later, Galas joined Los Angeles' youth soccer scene and later played in junior college, as well as graduating with a master’s degree in football industries from the University of Liverpool in England.

Coaching career
Prior to coaching in more prominent roles, Galas served as the head coach for the Boys Under-18 team at the Oregon United Soccer Academy, as the goalkeeper coach for the Region IV Olympic Development Program in Moscow, Idaho, and as the goalkeeping coach for Liverpool's Community Coaching Program.

In July 2000, Galas became assistant coach at Florida State University. After three seasons he was named assistant at the University of Oregon. Whilst in Oregon, Galas later served as an assistant coach with United Soccer League side Portland Timbers.

In 2007, Galas moved to the University of Arizona as an assistant, before been named associate head coach in 2009.

Following his spell at the University of Arizona, Galas become director of goalkeeping at Real Salt Lake's academy in Casa Grande, Arizona.

Galas made the move to NWSL side Portland Thorns as their assistant, until been named the sporting director and head coach of USL PDL side Lane United on September 24, 2013. Whilst with Lane United, Galas spent the off season between 2016 and 2017 to become assistant coach with Segunda División B side Villarreal B.

On January 11, 2019, Galas become assistant to head coach Darren Sawatzky at USL League One side FC Tucson. He then took over the head coaching position in January 2020, following Sawatzky's dismissal at the end of their inaugural League One season.

On June 29, 2021, Galas and Tucson mutually agreed to terminate his position at the club.

On January 28, 2022, it was announced that Galas had returned to Lane United FC as their head coach ahead of the 2022 USL League Two season.

References

Living people
American soccer coaches
USL League One coaches
Year of birth missing (living people)
FC Tucson coaches
Soccer players from Los Angeles
People from Woodland Hills, Los Angeles
Junior college men's soccer players in the United States
Alumni of the University of Liverpool
Florida State Seminoles women's soccer coaches
Oregon Ducks women's soccer coaches
Portland Timbers (USL) coaches
Arizona Wildcats women's soccer coaches
Real Salt Lake non-playing staff
Portland Thorns FC non-playing staff
Lane United FC
USL League Two coaches
Villarreal CF non-playing staff
American expatriate soccer coaches
Expatriate football managers in Spain
American expatriate sportspeople in Spain
Association footballers not categorized by position
Association football players not categorized by nationality